Cranes are a family, the Gruidae, of large, long-legged, and long-necked birds in the group Gruiformes. The 15 species of cranes are placed in three genera, Antigone, Balearica, and Grus. Unlike the similar-looking but unrelated herons, cranes fly with necks outstretched, not pulled back. Cranes live on most continents, with the exception of Antarctica and South America.

They are opportunistic feeders that change their diets according to the season and their own nutrient requirements. They eat a range of items from small rodents, eggs of birds, fish, amphibians, and insects to grain and berries.

Cranes construct platform nests in shallow water, and typically lay two eggs at a time. Both parents help to rear the young, which remain with them until the next breeding season.

Some species and populations of cranes migrate over long distances; others do not migrate at all. Cranes are solitary during the breeding season, occurring in pairs, but during the nonbreeding season, most species are gregarious, forming large flocks where their numbers are sufficient.

Most species of cranes have been affected by human activities and are at the least classified as threatened, if not critically endangered. The plight of the whooping cranes of North America inspired some of the first US legislation to protect endangered species.

Description

Cranes are very large birds, often considered the world's tallest flying birds. They are long-legged and long-necked birds with streamlined bodies and large, rounded wings. The males and females do not vary in external appearance, but males tend to be slightly larger than females.

The plumage of cranes varies by habitat. Species inhabiting vast, open wetlands tend to have more white in their plumage than do species that inhabit smaller wetlands or forested habitats, which tend to be more grey. These white species are also generally larger. The smaller size and colour of the forest species is thought to help them maintain a less conspicuous profile while nesting; two of these species (the common and sandhill cranes) also daub their feathers with mud which some observers suspect helps them to hide while nesting.

Most species of cranes have some areas of bare skin on their faces; the only two exceptions are the blue and demoiselle cranes. This skin is used in communication with other cranes, and can be expanded by contracting and relaxing muscles, and change the intensity of colour. Feathers on the head can be moved and erected in the blue, wattled, and demoiselle cranes for signaling, as well.

Also important to communication is the position and length of the trachea. In the two crowned cranes, the trachea is shorter and only slightly impressed upon the bone of the sternum, whereas the trachea of the other species is longer and penetrates the sternum. In some species, the entire sternum is fused to the bony plates of the trachea, and this helps amplify the crane's calls, allowing them to carry for several kilometres.

Evolution
The fossil record of cranes is incomplete. Apparently, the subfamilies were well distinct by the Late Eocene (around 35 mya). The present genera are apparently some 20 mya old. Biogeography of known fossil and the living taxa of cranes suggests that the group is probably of (Laurasian?) Old World origin. The extant diversity at the genus level is centered on (eastern) Africa, although no fossil record exists from there. On the other hand, it is peculiar that numerous fossils of Ciconiiformes are documented from there; these birds presumably shared much of their habitat with cranes back then already. Cranes are sister taxa to Eogruidae, a lineage of flightless birds; as predicted by the fossil record of true cranes, eogruids were native to the Old World. A species of true crane, Antigone cubensis, has similarly become flightless and ratite-like.

Fossil genera are tentatively assigned to the present-day subfamilies:

Gruinae
 Palaeogrus (Middle Eocene of Germany and Italy – Middle Miocene of France)
 Pliogrus (Early Pliocene of Eppelsheim, Germany)
 Camusia (Late Miocene of Menorca, Mediterranean)
 "Grus" conferta (Late Miocene/Early Pliocene of Contra Costa County, US)
Sometimes considered Balearicinae
 Geranopsis (Hordwell Late Eocene – Early Oligocene of England)
 Anserpica (Late Oligocene of France)
Sometimes considered Gruidae incertae sedis
 Eobalearica (Ferghana Late? Eocene of Ferghana, Uzbekistan)
 Probalearica (Late Oligocene? – Middle Pliocene of Florida, US, France?, Moldavia and Mongolia) – A nomen dubium?
 Aramornis (Sheep Creek Middle Miocene of Snake Creek Quarries, US)

Distribution and habitat

The cranes have a cosmopolitan distribution, occurring across most of the world continents. They are absent from Antarctica and, mysteriously, South America. East Asia has the highest crane diversity, with eight species, followed by Africa, which is home to five resident species and wintering populations of a sixth. Australia, Europe, and North America have two regularly occurring species each. Of the four crane genera, Balearica (two species) is restricted to Africa, and Leucogeranus (one species) is restricted to Asia; the other two genera, Grus (including Anthropoides and Bugeranus) and Antigone, are both widespread.

Many species of cranes are dependent on wetlands and grasslands, and most species nest in shallow wetlands. Some species nest in wetlands, but move their chicks up onto grasslands or uplands to feed (while returning to wetlands at night), whereas others remain in wetlands for the entirety of the breeding season. Even the demoiselle crane and blue crane, which may nest and feed in grasslands (or even arid grasslands or deserts), require wetlands for roosting at night. The Sarus Crane in south Asia is unique in having a significant breeding population using agricultural fields to breed in areas alongside very high density of humans and intensive farming, largely due to the positive attitudes of farmers towards the cranes. In Australia, the Brolga occurs in the breeding areas of Sarus Cranes in Queensland state, and they achieve sympatry by using different habitats. Sarus Cranes in Queensland largely live in Eucalyptus-dominated riverine, while most Brolgas use non-wooded regional ecosystems that include vast grassland habitats. The only two species that do not always roost in wetlands are the two African crowned cranes (Balearica), which are the only cranes to roost in trees.

Some crane species are sedentary, remaining in the same area throughout the year, while others are highly migratory, traveling thousands of kilometres each year from their breeding sites. A few species like Sarus Cranes have both migratory and sedentary populations, and healthy sedentary populations have a large proportion of cranes that are not territorial, breeding pairs.

Behaviour and ecology

The cranes are diurnal birds that vary in their sociality by season and location. During the breeding season, they are territorial and usually remain on their territory all the time. In contrast in the non-breeding season, they tend to be gregarious, forming large flocks to roost, socialize, and in some species feed. Sarus Crane breeding pairs maintain territories throughout the year in south Asia, and non-breeding birds live in flocks that can also be seen throughout the year. Large aggregations of cranes likely increase safety for individual cranes when resting and flying and also increase chances for young unmated birds to meet partners.

Calls and communication
Cranes are highly vocal and have several specialized calls. The vocabulary begins soon after hatching with low, purring  calls for maintaining contact with their parents, as well as food-begging calls. Other calls used as chicks include alarm calls and "flight intention" calls, both of which are maintained into adulthood. Cranes are noticed the most due to their loud duet calls that can be used to distinguish individual pairs. Sarus crane trios produce synchronized unison calls called "triets" whose structure is identical to duets of normal pairs, but have a lower frequency.

Feeding

The cranes consume a wide range of food, both animal and plant matter. When feeding on land, they consume seeds, leaves, nuts and acorns, berries, fruit, insects, worms, snails, small reptiles, mammals, and birds. In wetlands and agriculture fields, roots, rhizomes, tubers, and other parts of emergent plants, other molluscs, small fish, eggs of birds and amphibians are also consumed, as well. The exact composition of the diet varies by location, season, and availability. Within the wide range of items consumed, some patterns are suggested but require specific investigation to confirm; the shorter-billed species usually feed in drier uplands, while the longer-billed species feed in wetlands.

Cranes employ different foraging techniques for different food types and in different habitats. Tubers and rhizomes are dug for and a crane digging for them remains in place for some time digging and then expanding a hole to prise them out of the soil. In contrast both to this and the stationary wait and watch hunting methods employed by many herons, they forage for insects and animal prey by slowly moving forwards with their heads lowered and probing with their bills.

Where more than one species of cranes exists in a locality, each species adopts separate niches to minimise competition. At one important lake in Jiangxi Province in China, the Siberian cranes feed on the mudflats and in shallow water, the white-naped cranes on the wetland borders, the hooded cranes on sedge meadows, and the last two species also feed on the agricultural fields along with the common cranes. In Australia, where Sarus Cranes live alongside Brolgas, they have different diets: Sarus Cranes' diet consisted of diverse vegetation, while Brolga diet spanned a much wider range of trophic levels. Some crane species such as the Common/ Eurasian crane use a kleptoparasitic strategy to recover from temporary reductions in feeding rate, particularly when the rate is below the threshold of intake necessary for survival. Accumulated intake of during daytime shows a typical anti-sigmoid shape, with greatest increases of intake after dawn and before dusk.

Breeding

Cranes are perennially monogamous breeders, establishing long-term pair bonds that may last the lifetime of the birds. Pair bonds begin to form in the second or third years of life, but several years pass before the first successful breeding season. Initial breeding attempts often fail, and in many cases, newer pair bonds dissolve (divorce) after unsuccessful breeding attempts. Pairs that are repeatedly successful at breeding remain together for as long as they continue to do so. In a study of sandhill cranes in Florida, seven of the 22 pairs studied remained together for an 11-year period. Of the pairs that separated, 53% was due to the death of one of the pair, 18% was due to divorce, and the fate of 29% of pairs was unknown. Similar results had been found by acoustic monitoring (sonography/frequency analysis of duet and guard calls) in three breeding areas of common cranes in Germany over 10 years.

Cranes are territorial and generally seasonal breeders. Seasonality varies both between and within species, depending on local conditions. Migratory species begin breeding upon reaching their summer breeding grounds, between April and June. The breeding season of tropical species is usually timed to coincide with the wet or monsoon seasons. Artificial sources of water such as irrigation canals and irregular rainfall can sometimes provide adequate moisture to maintain wetland habitat outside the normal wet season, and allows for occasional aseasonal nesting throughout the year in few tropical species.

Territory sizes also vary depending on location. Tropical species can maintain very small territories, for example sarus cranes in India can breed on territories as small as one hectare where the area is of sufficient quality and disturbance by humans is minimal. Even in areas with a high density of humans, in the absence of directed persecution, species like Sarus Crane maintain territories as small as 5 ha when agricultural crops and landscape conditions are suitable. In contrast, red-crowned crane territories may require 500 hectares, and pairs may defend even larger territories than that, up to several thousand hectares. Territory defence is either acoustic with both birds performing the unison call, or more rarely, physical with attacks usually by the male. Because of this, females are much less likely to retain the territory than males in the event of the death of a partner. Rarely, breeding territorial crane pairs allow a third crane into the territory to form polygynous or polyandrous trios that improves the chances of survival of the pair's chicks. Trios of Sarus cranes were seen largely in marginal habitats and third birds were young suggesting that third cranes would benefit by gaining experience.

Taxonomy and systematics 

The 15 living species of cranes are placed in three genera. A molecular phylogenetic study published in 2010 found that the genus Grus, as then defined, was polyphyletic. In the resulting rearrangement to create monophyletic genera, the Siberian crane was moved to the resurrected monotypic genus Leucogeranus, while the sandhill crane, the white-naped crane, the sarus crane, and the brolga were moved to the resurrected genus Antigone. Some authorities recognize the additional genera Anthropoides (for the demoiselle crane and blue crane) and Bugeranus (for the wattled crane) on morphological grounds.

Species
List of all world Gruidae species according to the Catalogue of Life:

In mythology and symbolism

The cranes' beauty and spectacular mating dances have made them highly symbolic birds in many cultures with records dating back to ancient times. Crane mythology can be found in cultures around the world, from India to the Aegean, South Arabia, China, Korea, Japan, Australia, and North America.  

The Sanskrit epic poet Valmiki was inspired to write the first śloka couplet by the pathos of seeing a male sarus crane shot while dancing with its mate. 

In Mecca, in pre-Islamic South Arabia, Allāt, Uzza, and Manāt were believed to be the three chief goddesses of Mecca, they were called the "three exalted cranes" (an obscure word on which 'crane' is the usual gloss). See The Satanic Verses for the best-known story regarding these three goddesses.

The crane was a bird of omen. In the tale of Ibycus and the cranes, a thief attacked Ibycus (a poet of the sixth century BCE) and left him for dead. Ibycus called to a flock of passing cranes, which followed the attacker to a theater and hovered over him until, stricken with guilt, he confessed to the crime.

Pliny the Elder wrote that cranes would appoint one of their number to stand guard while they slept.  The sentry would hold a stone in its claw, so that if it fell asleep, it would drop the stone and waken. A crane holding a stone in its claw is a well-known symbol in heraldry, and is known as a crane in its vigilance. Notably, however, the crest of Clan Cranstoun depicts a sleeping crane still in vigilance and holding the rock in its raised claw.

Aristotle describes the migration of cranes in the History of Animals, adding an account of their fights with Pygmies as they wintered near the source of the Nile.  He describes as untruthful an account that the crane carries a touchstone inside it that can be used to test for gold when vomited up.  (This second story is not altogether implausible, as cranes might ingest appropriate gizzard stones in one locality and regurgitate them in a region where such stone is otherwise scarce.)

Greek and Roman myths often portrayed the dance of cranes as a love of joy and a celebration of life, and the crane was often associated with both Apollo and Hephaestus.

In pre-modern Ottoman Empire, sultans would sometimes present a piece of crane feather to soldiers of any group in the army (janissaries, sipahis, etc.) who performed heroically during a battle. Soldiers would attach this feather to their caps or headgear which would give them some sort of a rank among their peers.

Throughout Asia, the crane is a symbol of happiness and eternal youth. In China, several styles of kung fu take inspiration from the movements of cranes in the wild, the most famous of these styles being Wing Chun, Hung Gar (tiger crane), and the Shaolin Five Animals style of fighting. Crane movements are well known for their fluidity and grace. 

In Japan, the crane is one of the mystical or holy creatures (others include the dragon and the tortoise) and symbolizes good fortune and longevity because of its fabled life span of a thousand years. The crane is one of the subjects in the tradition of origami, or paper folding. An ancient Japanese legend promises that anyone who folds a thousand origami cranes will be granted a wish by a crane. In northern Hokkaidō, the women of the Ainu people performed a crane dance that was captured in 1908 in a photograph by Arnold Genthe. After World War II, the crane came to symbolize peace and the innocent victims of war through the story of schoolgirl Sadako Sasaki and her thousand origami cranes. Suffering from leukemia as a result of the atomic bombing of Hiroshima and knowing she was dying, she undertook to make a thousand origami cranes before her death at the age of 12. After her death, she became internationally recognised as a symbol of the innocent victims of war and remains a heroine to many Japanese girls.

In Australia, the Aboriginal People also perform a crane dance.

The Native Americans of North America also revere the crane. While it was a traditional food source for some tribes, it is considered a sacred bird. As with eagle feathers, crane feathers are used in special ceremonies and are protected by federal law. Native American tribes also used crane bones to make traditional tools, such as awls for leather work. Archaeologists discovered crane bones that had been polished and used by the Anasazi of Chaco Canyon in New Mexico, which were over 1,000 years old. The Crow and Cheyenne tribes traditionally used crane bones to make whistles that were used in battle. Additionally, the Navajo use the skulls and beaks of sandhill cranes to make medicine spoons.

See also
 Heron

Citations

General bibliography 
 Hayes, M.A. (2005): Divorce and extra-pair paternity as alternative mating strategies in monogamous sandhill cranes (PDF). MS thesis. Vermilion, S.D.: University of South Dakota. Via the International Crane Foundation's Library.

External links 

 Saving Cranes website (ICF)
 Craneworld website, mainly in German
 individual recognition of cranes using frequency analysis of their calls
 Gruidae videos on the Internet Bird Collection
 Crane sounds overview on xeno-canto.org
 Cranes of the World, by Paul Johnsgard

Myths and lore 
 Crane Dance at the Tongdosa Temple (archive link, was dead)
 Thousand Cranes lore

 

 
Taxa named by Nicholas Aylward Vigors